Second Baptist Church is a historic Baptist church located at Bloomington, Monroe County, Indiana.  It was designed by noted African-American architect Samuel Plato and built in 1913. It is a one-story, "L"-plan, Romanesque Revival style stone building on a raised basement.  It features broad round arched openings, a two-story bell tower, lancet windows, and oculus tracery.

It was listed on the National Register of Historic Places in 1983.  It is located in the Bloomington West Side Historic District.

References

Baptist churches in Indiana
African-American history of Indiana
Churches on the National Register of Historic Places in Indiana
Romanesque Revival architecture in Indiana
Churches completed in 1913
Buildings and structures in Bloomington, Indiana
National Register of Historic Places in Monroe County, Indiana
Historic district contributing properties in Indiana